The 1920 Romanian general strike was a major nationwide strike in the Kingdom of Romania, lasting between October 20 and 28 and involved the participation of most of the over 400,000 industrial workers from across the country. The demands of the workers included the recognition of the workers' factory committees, demilitarization of the industrial enterprises, abolition of the state of siege, elimination of censorship and the adoption of a new legislation regarding labour disputes. The strike was violently repressed by the government using the Romanian Army and the leaders of the workers were sentenced to prison.

References

Protests in Romania
Romanian general strike, 1950
Labor disputes in Romania
General strikes in Europe
Socialism in Romania
1920 labor disputes and strikes